Martín Arzuaga (born July 23, 1981) is a retired footballer who played as striker.

Career 
Arzuaga's previous clubs include Rosario Central of Argentina, CD Veracruz of Mexico and Godoy Cruz of Argentina. He debuted as a professional in Junior in 2000. His penalty-kick shootouts let him win the 2004 Colombian league title with Junior.

International goals
Scores and results list Colombia's goal tally first.

Attributes 
He's nicknamed "Torito de Becerril" (Becerril's Little Bull) in reference to his great leg strength and attacking power.

References

External links
 Argentine Primera statistics

1981 births
Living people
Colombian footballers
Colombian expatriate footballers
Atlético Junior footballers
Atlético Bucaramanga footballers
Cruz Azul footballers
C.D. Veracruz footballers
Godoy Cruz Antonio Tomba footballers
Rosario Central footballers
Club Deportivo Universidad de San Martín de Porres players
Juan Aurich footballers
Independiente Medellín footballers
José Gálvez FBC footballers
Uniautónoma F.C. footballers
América de Cali footballers
Jaguares de Córdoba footballers
Alianza Petrolera players
Real Cartagena footballers
Expatriate footballers in Argentina
Expatriate footballers in Mexico
Expatriate footballers in Peru
Colombia international footballers
2003 FIFA Confederations Cup players
2005 CONCACAF Gold Cup players
Categoría Primera A players
Categoría Primera B players
Argentine Primera División players
Association football forwards
People from Cesar Department